Raja Nalinaksha Roy (6 June 1902 – 7 October 1951) was the 49th Raja of the Chakma Circle.

Biography

Roy married Rani Benita Roy (1905–1990) née Sen, the daughter of Barrister Saral Sen and granddaughter of "Brahmanand" Keshub Chandra Sen, a Hindu social reformer from Brahma Samaj. He was installed as Chakma Raja on 7 March 1935.

Roy had three sons, Tridiv Roy, Samit Roy, Nandit Roy, and three daughters, Amiti Roy, Moitri Roy, and Rajashree Roy.

Roy met Sir John Anderson, the Governor of Bengal, at Rangamati in November 1935 during the latter's tour of the Chittagong Hill Tracts District.

It was during Roy's reign that India and Pakistan gained independence in 14–16 August 1947 CE and the Chittagong Hill Tracts was assigned to the independent State of Pakistan, though the district had a 98% non-Muslim population.

References

1902 births
1951 deaths
Chakma Royal Family
Chakma people
Bangladeshi Buddhists